"Ai am Best" (愛 am Best) is the first "best of" compilation album by Ai Otsuka. The album contains 13 pre-2006 tracks with the respective music video for each. "Ai am Best" was released on March 28, 2007. The title of the album is a pun on her first name, Ai, which is pronounced like the English word "I".

Formats:
CD+DVD and CD.

DVD Track list:
The respective PVs for each of the songs listed for the CD Track list
(The Music Clip for Track 13 「Love Music」 is the most recently filmed)

First Pressing comes in a blister case and bundled with <愛ハンコ>, a specially made carved stamp.

The album debuted at the number one spot on the Oricon charts and sold more than 60,000 copies on its first day—six times more than the second place album of the day. By the second day of release, it had already sold over 100,000 copies.

"Ai am Best" was re-released in a CD version limited press on 26 September 2007.

Secret track
There is a secret track at the end of the last track "Love Music". Tracks 14 though 98 are silent and are about 5 seconds each. Track 99 contains an old unreleased song, "Babashi".

The Ai am Best DVD contains a secret hidden track which requires a code to unlock:

With your DVD remote arrow buttons, press "Up" 9 times, then press "Right" 9 times, then press "Down" 9 times, then press "Left" 9 times and finally press "Enter" and the hidden clip will be revealed, "Best of Babashi"

Track listing 
CD Track Lists:
  
  
  
  Happy Days
  
  
  
  Cherish
  Smily
  
  
  
  Love Music

CD Hidden/Bonus Track Lists:
14. <Silent>
—-  15...97
98. <Silent>
99. 

DVD Track Lists:
桃ノ花ビラ Music Clip
さくらんぼ Music Clip
甘えんぼ Music Clip
Happy Days Music Clip
金魚花火 Music Clip
大好きだよ。 Music Clip
黒毛和牛上塩タン焼680円 Music Clip
Cherish Music Clip
Smily Music Clip
ビー玉 Music Clip
ネコに風船 Music Clip
プラネタリウム Music Clip
Love Music Music Clip

DVD Hidden/Bonus Track Lists:
14. Best of Babashi

Oricon sales charts (Japan)

References

2007 greatest hits albums
Ai Otsuka albums
2007 video albums
Music video compilation albums
Avex Group compilation albums
Avex Group video albums